Sanjit De Silva (born 31 October 1976) is a Sri Lankan actor and director who is known for his roles in The Company Men and American Desi.

Early life 
De Silva was born in Colombo and graduated from New York University's Tisch School of the Arts.

Career 
De Silva appeared in his first television series, American Desi, in the role of Chandu. In 2005 he appeared as a doctor in Jonny Zero and Law & Order: Special Victims Unit. De Silva has also appeared in several Law & Order franchises, where he appeared as Ali Mohammed in season 17, episode 15: "Melting Pot". In 2013, he directed his first film Time After where he received funds from Kickstarter with over 200 backers for the film.

In 2016, De Silva appeared in Thomas Kail's production of the world premiere of Dry Powder at The Public Theater in New York City opposite Hank Azaria, Claire Danes and John Krasinski.  In Summer of 2016, De Silva performed at New York's Shakespeare in the Park in Troilus and Cressida.  He also appeared in TV commercials on behalf of Shakespeare in the Park.

He starred as Azeem Bhatti in the play An Ordinary Muslim, written by Hammaad Chaudry at the New York Theatre Workshop in 2018.

Personal life 
De Silva is married to British actress Deepa Purohit and they have one child.

Filmography

Film

Television

References

External links 
 
 
 De Silva's production company
 
 Sanjit De Silva at Internet Off-Broadway Database

21st-century Sri Lankan male actors
1976 births
Living people
Sinhalese male actors
American people of Sri Lankan descent
Sri Lankan male film actors
Sri Lankan male television actors